Rajendra Chola II was a Telugu king and the fourth of Velanati Chodas who ruled from 1161 to 1181 AD.

He succeeded his father Gonka II and his reign was full of rebellions from Nellore Chodas, Pottapi Chodas and Pakanadu Chodas. He lost to Rudradeva of Kakatiyas. Their kingdom weakened during his period.

References
 Durga Prasad, History of the Andhras up to 1565 A. D., P. G. PUBLISHERS, GUNTUR (1988)
 South Indian Inscriptions - http://www.whatisindia.com/inscriptions/

Velanati Chodas
12th-century Indian monarchs